This is a list of Royal Danish Army regiments that have existed since the 15th century. Most formations have changed names several times during their existence. Listed here are commonly used names.

Infantry 
Regiment disband in the modern era (1951–present) or still present:
  Royal Life Guards
  1st Regiment (Danish Life Regiment) merged into Guard Hussar Regiment on 1 January 2001
  2nd Regiment (Schleswig Regiment of Foot) merged into Prince's Life Regiment on 1 January 2001. Reactivated on 1 January 2019.
  3rd Regiment (Prince's Life Regiment) merged into Jutland Dragoon Regiment on 1 August 2005
  4th Regiment (Zealand Life Regiment) merged into Guard Hussar Regiment on 1 January 2001
  5th Regiment (Falster Regiment of Foot) merged into Danish Life Regiment on 1 August 1976
  6th Regiment (Funen Life Regiment) merged into Schleswig Regiment of Foot on 1 November 1991
  7th Regiment (Jutlandic Regiment of Foot) merged with King's Regiment of Foot into King's Jutlandic Regiment of Foot on 1 November 1961 
  8th Regiment (Queen's Life Regiment) merged into Prince's Life Regiment on 1 January 2001
  9th Regiment (King's Regiment of Foot from 1961 King's Jutlandic Regiment of Foot) merged into Schleswig Regiment of Foot 1 November 1991
  10th Regiment (Field Lord's Regiment of Foot) merged into Queen's Life Regiment on 1 August 1961
  Marine Regiment, three infantry battalions under Bornholm's Værn, disbanded 2000
  Infantry Pioneer Command (1938-1951) merged into King's Regiment of Foot
Regiment disband before the modern era:
 2nd Danish Recruited Infantry Regiment (1703–1721)
  Copenhagen Infantry Regiment (1808–1816)
 Fyen National Regiment (of foot) (1733-1765)
 Fyen Recruited Infantry Regiment (1733–1789) merged in the Prince's Life Regiment
 Grenadier Guards (1701–1763)
 Halberdier Guard (1571–1763)
  Holstein Infantry Regiment (1778–1951)
 Kiel Infantry Regiment (1773–1773)
  Northern Jutland National Regiment (of foot) (1733–1765)
  Oldenburg Infantry Regiment (1747–1951)
 Oldenburg National Regiment (1704–1765)
 Prince Georg's Regiment (1658–1721)
 Plön Recruited Infantry Regiment (1764–1767)
 Southern Jutland National Regiment (of foot) (1733–1765)
 Schleswig National Regiment (of foot) (1737–1765)
 Schleswig-Holstein National Regiment (1737–1765)
 Scanian Regiment (1614-1658)
 Viborg Recruited Infantry Regiment (1703–1789)
  Zealand Infantry Regiment (1675–1803) merged in the Marine Regiment
  Zealand National Regiment (of foot) (1735–1765)

Cavalry 
Regiment disband in the modern era our still present:
  Jutland Dragoon Regiment (1679–present)
  Guard Hussar Regiment (1762-2000)
  Guard Hussar Regiment (After amalgamation the year from Zealand Life Regiment is used)(1614–present)
Regiment disband before the modern era:
 1st Dragoon Regiment (1672–1856)
 2nd Dragoon Regiment (1683–1910)
 3rd Dragoon Regiment (1670–1932), merged with 5th Dragoon Regiment in 1932 to form the Jutland Dragoon Regiment
 4th Dragoon Regiment (1670–1923)
 5th Dragoon Regiment (1679–1932), merged with 3rd Dragoon Regiment in 1932 to form the Jutland Dragoon Regiment
 6th Dragoon Regiment (1670–1865), merged into 3rd Dragoon Regiment
 3rd Zealand National Mounted Regiment (1675–1721)
 Holstein's Lancers Regiment (1700–1842)
 Royal Horse Guards (1661–1866)
 Oldenburg Cuirassier Regiment (1703–1767)
 Zealand Cuirassier Regiment (1670–1767)
 Zealand Dragoon Regiment (1670–1789)
 Schleswig's Cuirassier Regiment (1675–1842)

Artillery and other regiments

Artillery 
 Fortress Artillery Regiment (1892-1922)
 Coastal Artillery Regiment (1909-1932), amalgamated into Royal Danish Navy
  1st Field Artillery Regiment (Crown's Artillery Regiment), merged with 2nd Field Artillery Regiment in 1982 to form the King's Artillery Regiment.
  2nd Field Artillery Regiment (Zealand Artillery Regiment), merged with 1st Field Artillery Regiment in 1982 to form the King's Artillery Regiment.
  3rd Field Artillery Regiment (North Jutland Artillery Regiment), merged with 4th Field Artillery Regiment in 2000 to form the Queen's Artillery Regiment.
  4th Field Artillery Regiment (Southern Jutland Artillery Regiment), merged with 3rd Field Artillery Regiment in 2000 to form the Queen's Artillery Regiment.
  King's Artillery Regiment (1982–2005), merged with Queen's Artillery Regiment in 2005 to form the Danish Artillery Regiment.
  Queen's Artillery Regiment (2000–2005), merged with King's Artillery Regiment in 2005 to form the Danish Artillery Regiment.
  Danish Artillery Regiment (2005–2014), disbanded in 2014 and reformed into 1st Danish Artillery Battalion. Reactivated on 1 January 2019.

Air Defence
  Zealand Air Defence Regiment (1937–1970), merged into Crown's Artillery Regiment
  Jutlandic Air Defence Regiment (1951–1974), merged into North Jutland Artillery Regiment

Armour 
See under Cavalry units

Aviation
  Army Aviation Troops (1912–1950).
  Army Air Corps (1971–2003), amalgamated into Squadron 724 of the Royal Danish Air Force.

Engineers
  Zealandic Engineer Regiment, merged with Jutlandic Engineer Regiment in 1997 to form the Engineer Regiment.
  Jutlandic Engineer Regiment, merged with Zealandic Engineer Regiment in 1997 to form the Engineer Regiment.
  Engineer Regiment (1997–present)

Logistic 
  Army Materiel Command (1602–2007) merged with navy and air force counterpart to form Defence Acquisition and Logistics Organization.
  Zealandic Logistic Regiment (1951–1997), merged with Jutlandic Logistic Regiment to form the Train Regiment.
  Jutlandic Logistic Regiment (1951–1997), merged with Zealandic Logistic Regiment to form the Train Regiment.
  Train Regiment (1997–present).
  Danish International Logistical Center (2001–2014), merged into Train Regiment.

Signal
  Zealandic Signal Regiment, merged with Jutlandic Signal Regiment in 1992 to form the Signal Regiment.
  Jutlandic Signal Regiment, merged with Zealandic Signal Regiment in 1992 to form the Signal Regiment.
  Command Support Regiment (1992–present).

Other
  , disbanded 2000
  Army Military Police (1947–2014), merged with Navy and Air force Military Police.
  Intelligence Regiment (2014–present).
  Jaeger Corps (1961–present).

See also 
Royal Danish Army
List of wars involving Denmark
Military history of Denmark
 Structure of the Royal Danish Army

References